The Carnegie Library in Anaheim, California is a Carnegie library building built in 1908. The Classical Revival style building was designed by John C. Austin, and opened in 1909.

It was a public library until 1963. During the 1970s it served as the personnel office for the City of Anaheim. It is now one of the buildings of the MUZEO, a museum of local culture, history and art.

The Anaheim Carnegie Library was listed on the National Register of Historic Places in 1979.

It is the only Carnegie library remaining in Orange County;  others in Fullerton, Orange, Santa Ana, and Huntington Beach did not survive.

See also
National Register of Historic Places listings in Orange County, California

References

External links

 MUZEO

Carnegie libraries in California
Buildings and structures in Anaheim, California
Tourist attractions in Anaheim, California
Libraries in Orange County, California
Museums in Orange County, California
Library buildings completed in 1908
Libraries on the National Register of Historic Places in California
National Register of Historic Places in Orange County, California
Neoclassical architecture in California
Mediterranean Revival architecture in California
Culture of Anaheim, California
History of Anaheim, California
1908 establishments in California